Ludovic Paratte (born 1 February 1992) is a Swiss footballer who plays for FC Veyrier Sports.

References

External links
 Ludovic Paratte profile at servettefc.ch

1992 births
Footballers from Geneva
Living people
Swiss men's footballers
Association football midfielders
Servette FC players
FC Fribourg players
FC Stade Nyonnais players
FC Meyrin players
GOAL FC players
Swiss Super League players
Swiss Promotion League players
Swiss 1. Liga (football) players
2. Liga Interregional players
Championnat National 2 players
Swiss expatriate footballers
Expatriate footballers in France